Baron Alphonse Victor Chrétien Balleydier (15 January 1810, Lyon – 10 November 1859, Lyon) was a 19th-century French man of letters, historian and historiographer.

Publications 
Nouvelles lyonnaises (1843) Read online
Les Bords du Rhône, de Lyon à la mer, chroniques et Légendes (1843)
Histoire politique et militaire du peuple de Lyon pendant la Révolution française (1789-1795) (3 volumes, 1845-1846)
Rome et Pie IX (1847)
Histoire de la garde mobile depuis les barricades de février. Avec l'état nominatif des officiers de chaque bataillon, ainsi que la liste complète des morts et des blessés victimes des 4 journées de juin (1848)
La Première Légion à Cherbourg. Impressions de voyage (1848)
Turin et Charles-Albert (1848)  Read online
Histoire de la garde républicaine (1848) 
Le Couvent et la caserne des Célestins (1849)  Read online
Dieu ne le veut pas, ou les Révolutionnaires peints par eux-mêmes (1849)   à Read online
Visite rendue par l'Angleterre à la France ou Une semaine à Paris pendant les vacances de Pâques (1849)
La vérité sur les affaires de Naples, Réfutations des lettres de Monsieur Gladstone (1851)
Histoire de la Révolution de Rome, tableau religieux, politique et militaire des années 1846, 1847, 1848, 1849 et 1850 en Italie (2 volumes, 1851)
Histoire des révolutions de l'Empire d'Autriche, années 1848 et 1849 (1853)
Histoire de la guerre de Hongrie en 1848-1849, pour faire suite à l'Histoire des révolutions de l'Empire d'Autriche (1853)
Veillées de famille (1855)
Veillées maritimes (1856)
Histoire de l'Empereur Nicolas (trente années de règne) (2 volumes, 1857)
Histoire de Sainte Gudule et du Saint Sacrement du Miracle (1859)
Veillées de vacances (1859)
Veillées du presbytère (1860)
Veillées du peuple (1862) Read online
Une Promenade historique (1863)
Histoire d'un œuf de Pâques (1876)
Le Petit Chaperon blanc (1876)
Récits du foyer (1876)  Read online
Valeria ou les premiers chrétiens et autres histoires (1890)

External links 
 Alphonse Balleydier (1810-1859) on data.bnf.fr
 Genealogy
 Alphonse Balleydier on The Online Books Page

19th-century French writers
19th-century French historians
Historians of the French Revolution
French historiographers
Writers from Lyon
1810 births
1859 deaths